Volodymyr Smarovoz (11 May 1956) is a former professional Soviet football defender and coach.

Smarovoz was one of the most played for SKA Odesa with 315 yielding only to Serhiy Marusyn.

References

External links
 

1956 births
Living people
Soviet footballers
FC Metalurh Zaporizhzhia players
SKA Odesa players
FC SKA-Lotto Odesa players
Ukrainian football managers
SC Odesa managers
Association football defenders